In botany, the radicle is the first part of a seedling (a growing plant embryo) to emerge from the seed during the process of germination. The radicle is the embryonic root of the plant, and grows downward in the soil (the shoot emerges from the plumule). Above the radicle is the embryonic stem or hypocotyl, supporting the cotyledon(s).

It is the embryonic root inside the seed. It is the first thing to emerge from a seed and down into the ground to allow the seed to suck up water and send out its leaves so that it can start photosynthesizing.

The radicle emerges from a seed through the micropyle. Radicles in seedlings are classified into two main types.  Those pointing away from the seed coat scar or hilum are classified as antitropous, and those pointing towards the hilum are syntropous.

If the radicle begins to decay, the seedling undergoes pre-emergence damping off.  This disease appears on the radicle as darkened spots.  Eventually, it causes death of the seedling.

The plumule is the baby shoot. It grows after the radicle.

In 1880 Charles Darwin published a book about plants he had studied, The Power of Movement in Plants, where he mentions the radicle.

See also
Plant perception (physiology)

References

Plant anatomy
Plant morphology
Plant cognition